The Bundesstraße 92 (Federal route 92) (abbreviation: B 92) is a Bundesstraße through the states of Thuringia and Saxony, Germany.

History 
The stretch of road from Elsterberg - Schönbach (Vogtland) was built since 1854 .

During the Nazi-era, from 1938 to 1945 the road was known Reichsstraße 92 (R 92). It began originally in Böhlen near Leipzig and went via Zeitz through Gera and then into the then-annexed area of the Sudetenland (in modern-day Czech Republic) via Františkovy Lázně, Mariánské Lázně, Bor (Tachov District), Horšovský Týn, Klatovy, Strakonice to Vodňany near České Budějovice.

In East Germany the road had the name Fernverkehrsstraße 92 (F 92).

See also 
European route E49
 List of federal highways in Germany
 List of roads in Saxony

List of roads in Saxony

References

Bundesstraße
Roads in Thuringia
Roads in Saxony